Firs are evergreen coniferous trees belonging to the genus Abies in the family Pinaceae. There are approximately 48–56 extant species, found on mountains throughout much of North and Central America, Europe, Asia, and North Africa. The genus is most closely related to Cedrus (cedar).

The genus name is derived from the Latin "to rise" in reference to the height of its species. The common English name originates with the Old Norse, fyri, or the Old Danish, fyr.

Firs can be distinguished from other members of the pine family by the way in which their needle-like leaves are attached singly to the branches with a base resembling a suction cup, and by their cones, which, like those of true cedars, stand upright on the branches like candles and disintegrate at maturity.

Identification of the different species is based on the size and arrangement of the leaves, the size and shape of the cones, and whether the bract scales of the cones are long and exserted, or short and hidden inside the cone.

Description

Leaves 

Firs can be distinguished from other members of the pine family by the unique attachment of their needle-like leaves to the twig by a base that resembles a small suction cup.

The leaves are significantly flattened, sometimes even looking like they are pressed, as in A. sibirica.

The leaves have two whitish lines on the bottom, each of which is formed by wax-covered stomatal bands. In most species, the upper surface of the leaves is uniformly green and shiny, without stomata or with a few on the tip, visible as whitish spots. Other species have the upper surface of leaves dull, gray-green or bluish-gray to silvery (glaucous), coated by wax with variable number of stomatal bands, and not always continuous. An example species with shiny green leaves is A. alba, and an example species with dull waxy leaves is A. concolor.

The tips of leaves are usually more or less notched (as in A. firma), but sometimes rounded or dull (as in A. concolor, A. magnifica) or sharp and prickly (as in A. bracteata, A. cephalonica, A. holophylla). The leaves of young plants are usually sharper.

The way they spread from the shoot is very diverse, only in some species comb-shaped, with the leaves arranged on two sides, flat (A. alba) 

The upper foliage is different on cone-bearing branches, with the leaves short, curved, and sharp.

Cones 

In contrast to spruces, fir cones do not hang. Even large fir cones grow upwards like "candles", the new growth of the tree.

Mature cones are usually brown, young in summer can be green, for example:
A. grandis, A. holophylla, A. nordmanniana

or purple and blue, sometimes very dark:
A. fraseri, A. homolepis (var. umbellata green), A. koreana ('Flava' green), A. lasiocarpa, A. nephrolepis (f. chlorocarpa green), A. sibirica, A. veitchii (var. olivacea green).

Phytochemistry 
Abies produce a variety of terpenoids. The analyses of the Zavarin groupfrom Smedman et al 1969 to Zavarin  et al 1977showed variation in terpenoid composition of the bark by genetics, geography, age and size of the tree.

Classification 
The oldest pollen assignable to the genus dates to the Late Cretaceous in Siberia, with records of leaves and reproductive organs across the Northern Hemisphere from the Eocene onwards.

Section Abies
Section Abies is found in central, south, and eastern Europe and Asia Minor.
 Abies alba – silver fir
 Abies nebrodensis – Sicilian fir
 Abies borisii-regis – Bulgarian fir
 Abies cephalonica – Greek fir
 Abies nordmanniana – Nordmann fir or Caucasian fir
 Abies nordmanniana subsp. equi-trojani – Kazdağı fir, Turkish fir
 Abies pinsapo – Spanish fir
 Abies pinsapo var. marocana – Moroccan fir
 Abies numidica – Algerian fir
 Abies cilicica – Syrian fir

Section Balsamea
Section Balsamea is found in northern Asia and North America, and high mountains further south.
 Abies fraseri – Fraser fir
 Abies balsamea – balsam fir
 Abies balsamea var. phanerolepis – bracted balsam fir
 Abies lasiocarpa – subalpine fir
 Abies lasiocarpa var. arizonica – corkbark fir
 Abies lasiocarpa var. bifolia – Rocky Mountains subalpine fir
 Abies sibirica – Siberian fir
 Abies sibirica var. semenovii
 Abies sachalinensis – Sakhalin fir
 Abies koreana – Korean fir
 Abies nephrolepis – Khinghan fir
 Abies veitchii – Veitch's fir
 Abies veitchii var. sikokiana – Shikoku fir

Section Grandis
Section Grandis is found in western North America to Mexico, Guatemala, Honduras and El Salvador, in lowlands in the north, moderate altitudes in south.
 Abies grandis – grand fir or giant fir
 Abies grandis var. grandis – Coast grand fir
 Abies grandis var. idahoensis – interior grand fir
 Abies concolor – white fir
 Abies concolor subsp. concolor – Rocky Mountain white fir or Colorado white fir
 Abies concolor subsp. lowiana – Low's white fir or Sierra Nevada white fir
 Abies durangensis – Durango fir
 Abies durangensis var. coahuilensis – Coahuila fir
 Abies flinckii – Jalisco fir
 Abies guatemalensis – Guatemalan fir
 Abies guatemalensis var. guatemalensis
 Abies guatemalensis var. jaliscana
 Abies vejarii

Section Momi
Section Momi is found in east and central Asia and the Himalaya, generally at low to moderate altitudes.
 Abies kawakamii – Taiwan fir
 Abies homolepis – Nikko fir
 Abies recurvata – Min fir
 Abies recurvata var. ernestii – Min fir
 Abies firma – Momi fir
 Abies beshanzuensis – Baishanzu fir
 Abies holophylla – Manchurian fir
 Abies chensiensis – Shensi fir
 Abies chensiensis subsp. salouenensis – Salween fir
 Abies pindrow – Pindrow fir
 Abies ziyuanensis – Ziyuan fir

Section Amabilis
Section Amabilis is found in the Pacific Coast mountains in North America and Japan, in high rainfall areas.
 Abies amabilis – Pacific silver fir
 Abies mariesii – Maries' fir

Section Pseudopicea

Section Pseudopicea is found in the Sino – Himalayan mountains at high altitudes.
 Abies delavayi – Delavay's fir
 Abies delavayi var. nukiangensis
 Abies delavayi var. motuoensis
 Abies delavayi subsp. fansipanensis
 Abies fabri – Faber's fir
 Abies fabri subsp. minensis
 Abies forrestii – Forrest's fir
 Abies densa – Bhutan fir
 Abies spectabilis – East Himalayan fir
 Abies fargesii –  Farges' fir
 Abies fanjingshanensis – Fanjingshan fir
 Abies yuanbaoshanensis – Yuanbaoshan fir
 Abies squamata – flaky fir

Section Oiamel
Section Oiamel is found in central Mexico at high altitudes.
 Abies religiosa – sacred fir
 Abies hickelii – Hickel's fir
 Abies hickelii var. oaxacana – Oaxaca fir

Section Nobilis

Section Nobilis (western U.S., high altitudes)
 Abies procera – noble fir
 Abies magnifica – red fir
 Abies magnifica var. shastensis – Shasta red fir

Section Bracteata
Section Bracteata (California coast)
 Abies bracteata – bristlecone fir

Section Incertae sedis
Section Incertae sedis
 †Abies milleri – (Extinct) Early Eocene

Ecology 
Firs are used as food plants by the caterpillars of some Lepidoptera species, including Chionodes abella (recorded on white fir), autumnal moth, conifer swift (a pest of balsam fir), the engrailed, grey pug, mottled umber, pine beauty and the tortrix moths Cydia illutana (whose caterpillars are recorded to feed on European silver fir cone scales) and C. duplicana (on European silver fir bark around injuries or canker).

Uses 

Wood of most firs is considered unsuitable for general timber use and is often used as pulp or for the manufacture of plywood and rough timber. Because this genus has no insect or decay resistance qualities after logging, it is generally recommended in construction purposes for indoor use only (e.g. indoor drywall on framing). Firwood left outside cannot be expected to last more than 12 to 18 months, depending on the type of climate it is exposed to.

Nordmann fir, noble fir, Fraser fir and balsam fir are popular Christmas trees, generally considered to be the best for this purpose, with aromatic foliage that does not shed many needles on drying out. Many fir species are grown in botanic gardens and other specialist tree collections in Europe and North America. Fir Tree Appreciation Day is June 18.

Abies religiosa—sacred fir, is the overwinter host for the monarch butterfly.

Abies spectabilis or Talispatra is used in Ayurveda as an antitussive (cough suppressant) drug.

See also
 Douglas fir

References

Further reading 

 Philips, Roger.  Trees of North America and Europe, Random House, Inc., New York , 1979.

External links 

 Abies at The Gymnosperm Database
 Abies from the website Trees and Shrubs Online
 Michael P. FRANKIS CONE COLLECTION: Abies at the Arboretum de Villardebelle—images of cones of selected species
 Platt, Karen "Gold Fever" provides descriptions of golden or yellow-leaved Abies cultivars

 
Pinaceae
Extant Ypresian first appearances
Taxa named by Philip Miller